MSC Bruxelles is one of the largest container ships in the world. She has a maximum capacity of 9,200 TEU . The ship is owned by Santa Loretta Shipping Corp.

Hull and engine

MSC Bruxelles was built by Samsung Heavy Industries in yard 1511 and was finished in November 2005. This dry cargo  container ship is operated by Redeerei Claus-Peter Offen GmbH & Co. KG and the Port of Registry is Monrovia, Liberia. MSC Bruxelles has a length of 337m, a beam of 46m, a draught of 15m, and a depth of 27m.

MSC Bruxelles is powered by a MAN-B&W 12K98MC-C, 2 stroke 12 cylinder engine, capable of producing 68,520 kW, or 93,159 hp driving one fixed pitch propeller.

References

External links
Mediterranean Shipping Company
Ship location and status
Ship builder

Container ships
2005 ships
Ships built by Samsung Heavy Industries